Eszter Poljak (born 17 August 1952) is a Yugoslav sports shooter. She competed at the 1988 Summer Olympics and the 1992 Summer Olympics.

References

1952 births
Living people
Yugoslav female sport shooters
Olympic shooters of Yugoslavia
Olympic shooters as Independent Olympic Participants
Shooters at the 1988 Summer Olympics
Shooters at the 1992 Summer Olympics
Place of birth missing (living people)